FS Air Service is an American airline based in Anchorage, Alaska, USA. It was established in 1986 by Floyd Saltz, and operates regional passenger and cargo services, as well as cargo charters. In 1996, FS Air acquired a LearJet 35, which became the cornerstone of its medevac business. At its height, FS operated 2 Lears, 3 Metroliners, 2 Merlins, a Casa, and 2 Navajos. This fleet and its staff of well-qualified pilots and mechanics allowed FS to fulfill its mission statement: "Anything, Anytime, Anywhere!"

FS was also the first FAR Part 135 Aviation Operator in Alaska to be owned and operated by a woman, Sandi Saltz after a tragic controlled decedent into terrain by husband Floyd on arrival into St. Paul.island AK  Later that year Robert Cannon was brought on as vice president and helped build the company back to a successful airline. Sandi and Bob believed strongly in overlooking diversity and worked side by side to keep Floyd’s legacy alive. as well being a strong leader Robert and Sandi were known as employing Alaska's first woman Chief Pilot.

In January 2005, the FS Air Service fleet consisted of one CASA C-212-200 Aviocar. 

Sadly it is unclear what happened financially to the business, however it’s certain that during a major scheduled operation on Robert. The Owner and Son thought best to consolidate. Robert was released while in the hospital recovering and new management gave poor business planning leading to the loss of the company’s medivac contracts. 
Ultimately F.S. Air service allegedly filed bankruptcy and closed there soon after.

External links
 BBB profile

1986 establishments in Alaska
Airlines established in 1986
Airlines based in Alaska
Defunct airlines of the United States
Companies based in Anchorage, Alaska